The 2015–16 VfL Wolfsburg season was the 71st season in the club's football history. In the previous season, Wolfsburg had finished in second place and qualified for the UEFA Champions League. Additionally, they won their first DFB-Pokal trophy in the club's history, defeating Borussia Dortmund in the final.

They opened their season by winning their first DFL-Supercup in the club's history by defeating Bayern Munich in the 2015 final on penalties following a 1–1 draw after 90 minutes.

Players
As of 30 August 2015

Transfers

In

Out

|}

Competitions

DFL-Supercup

Bundesliga

League table

Results summary

Results by round

Matches

DFB-Pokal

UEFA Champions League

Group stage

Knockout phase

Round of 16

Quarter-finals

Statistics

Appearances and goals

|-
! colspan=14 style=background:#dcdcdc; text-align:center| Goalkeepers

|-
! colspan=14 style=background:#dcdcdc; text-align:center| Defenders

|-
! colspan=14 style=background:#dcdcdc; text-align:center| Midfielders

|-
! colspan=14 style=background:#dcdcdc; text-align:center| Forwards

|-
! colspan=14 style=background:#dcdcdc; text-align:center| Players transferred out during the season

Goalscorers
This includes all competitive matches.  The list is sorted by shirt number when total goals are equal.

References

Wolfsburg
VfL Wolfsburg seasons
Wolfsburg